Gregg Allman Live: Back to Macon, GA is the second live album by American singer-songwriter Gregg Allman, released on August 7, 2015 by Rounder Records. Recorded at the Grand Opera House in Macon, Georgia, the CD/DVD package showcases Allman's eight-piece solo band.

Reception
The album received critical acclaim. Hal Horowitz of American Songwriter wrote that the record "shows Allman not only hasn't lost any steps musically, but he just may be near the top of his game." Stephen Thomas Erlewine at AllMusic praised the casual nature of the concert, commenting, " there are hits, but not enough for this to be an oldies revue; there are obscurities, but they don't distract; there is virtuosity, but no showboating; there's stylistic diversity, but it feels unified – and that's why it's worth experiencing: it's an old pro whose home is a stage, no matter where that stage is and who happens to be on it."

Track listing

References

External links
 Official website

2015 albums
Gregg Allman albums
Rounder Records albums